Jibba Jabba was a British pre-school television series which aired on the children's block Tiny Living on the channel Living TV.

The series is a computer animation series consisting of 32 five-minute episodes. It centers around two friends, 'Mo' and 'Max'. In each episode one character approaches a tree-house containing a dressing up box for Mo or Max to become a part of the story told in the episode. The stories told would often be a reenactment of a famous fairy tale or rhyme. Each episode included audience participation from children, calling out or responding. The series was presented and narrated by a puppet called 'Dog', as seen on sister show Tiny and Crew. Dog also provided in-vision presentation for the channel's Tiny Living strand.

References

2000s British children's television series
2003 British television series endings
British children's animated television shows
British television shows featuring puppetry
2000s British animated television series
British preschool education television series
Animated preschool education television series
2000s preschool education television series